Dabnitsa is a village in Garmen Municipality, in Blagoevgrad Province, Bulgaria. It is situated in the Dabrash part of the Rhodope Mountains near Mesta river, 4 kilometers south-southeast of Garmen and 79 kilometers southeast of Blagoevgrad.

The area has been inhabited during the Thracian and Roman period and in the Second Bulgarian Empire. There are remains of an old fortress "St. Archangel" 1 kilometer north of the village from that period. In Ottoman times it was called Dubniçe (Ottoman Turkish: دوبنيچه ). Nowadays the village is lying at a suitable for transportation spot, where the third class roads from Garmen and Hadzhidimovo are connected with the third class road between Gotse Delchev and Satovcha.

The plain terrain and the Mediterranean influence in the valley of Mesta river are suitable for agriculture and sheep and goat pasturage. There are no major industrial subjects. A center for revival of the traditional handicrafts of making traditional musical instruments works in the village. The village is supplied with electricity by aerial wires. Drinking water is provided by a pumping station from Mesta river. The village has sewerage system.

Most of the people in Dabnitsa are of Muslim Turks

origin but often declare themselves as Turks, despite their mother tongue is Bulgarian. There is a mosque and a church "St Archangel Michael", opened in 1937.

The school in Dabnitsa was opened in 1925 as elementary school, moved to a new building in 1958 and became primary school in 1960. The primary school "Hristo Botev" is collecting the children from the village. There is also a kindergarten and a community center with a public library.

There are two doctors providing health care in the village-one is a general-practitioner and one is a dentist. They work in the village.

An amateur football club and FC "Edinstvo" is playing in the regional football group.

References

Villages in Blagoevgrad Province